Pefkakia is a metro station in Nea Ionia, Athens, Greece.  It is marked at the 17.231 km from the starting point in Piraeus.  The station is founded by the limits of Nea Ionia and is named after the neighbourhood of Pefkakia.  It was first opened on 5 July 1956 and was renovated in 2004. It has two platforms.

Between the 1990s and 2002, the station was known as Pefkakia-Inepoli, the second name originated from the neighbourhood of Inepoli, the name of the station dropped the second name during the start of the construction and is the current name since that time.

References

Athens Metro stations
Railway stations opened in 1956
1956 establishments in Greece